Kenza Fortas (born 26 January 2001 in Bagnols-sur-Cèze) is a French actress. In her first film she played the title role in Scheherazade. She also appeared in BAC Nord directed by Cédric Jimenez.

External links

French film actresses
21st-century French actresses
Living people
2001 births
Most Promising Actress César Award winners
People from Bagnols-sur-Cèze